The first season, retroactively titled level 1, of the Zatch Bell! anime series was directed by Tetsuji Nakamura and Yukio Kaizawa and produced by Toei Animation. Based on the manga series by Makoto Raiku, the plot follows the adventures of Zatch Bell, a Mamodo who is sent to Earth and partnered with the human Kiyo Takamine for a battle that adjudges the new monarchy of the Mamodo world. The season adapts volumes 1 through 11 of the manga, and also features original, self-contained subplots.

Viz Media provided the English dub of the anime, which aired on Cartoon Network's Toonami and Miguzi scheduling blocks in the United States and on YTV's Bionix programming block in Canada starting March 5, 2005. The episodes were collected into seventeen DVD compilations and released by Shogakukan between November 19, 2003, and April 20, 2005. The dubbed episodes of this season were collected into thirteen DVD compilations and released by Viz Media between November 8, 2005, and December 4, 2007.

Four pieces of theme music are used throughout the season: one opening theme and two closing themes in the Japanese episodes, and a single theme each for the opening and ending in the dubbed episodes. The first ending theme is "Personal" by Aya Ueto, used up to episode 30; and the second ending theme is "Stars" by King for the rest of the season. Additionally, the song  by Rino was used as an insert theme in episode 22. The opening theme in the English airing is "Zatch Bell! Theme" by Thorsten Laewe and Greg Prestopino, with an instrumental version selected as the closing theme.



Summary
The series opens with an amnesiac Zatch Bell meeting up with Kiyo Takamine at his home in modern-day Japan. Kiyo is initially hostile toward him, but he soon learns that Zatch is one of a hundred Mamodo vying for the crown of the Mamodo world, and that they are waging a tournament by partnering with humans in order to attack one another with spells—the loser would return to the Mamodo world. Realizing that he is Zatch’s partner, Kiyo vows to carry him to victory at any cost. While confronting more of Zatch’s kind, they come across a gentle-hearted Mamodo named Kolulu whose spell transforms her into a mindless beast with purely violent instincts. This would motivate Zatch into becoming a “benevolent king” and ending the brutal tradition of battle forever. He and Kiyo also strike up alliances with other Mamodo and their human partners, who occasionally assist them throughout the season.

As the tournament wears on, at one point, Kiyo and Zatch journey to England to investigate a claim of a Mamodo resembling Zatch seen there, and to explore Zatch’s forgotten origins. They also defeat a Mamodo and its bombastic human partner to rescue Kiyo’s father, Professor Seitaro Takamine, who then gives his son a 1,000-year-old lithograph bearing a Mamodo for analysis. Toward the end of the season, the artifact goes missing, and the two encounter Dr. Riddles and his Mamodo Kido, who battle them merely to help Zatch gain more spells. Riddles then divulges that he attempted to steal the lithograph for safekeeping, but someone else reclaimed it; he therefore warns Zatch and Kiyo to brace for the next phase of the tournament.

Episodes list

Notes

References 
General
 
 
 

Specific

2003 Japanese television seasons
2004 Japanese television seasons
Season 1